Maragheh and Ajabshir (electoral district) is the 2nd electoral district in the East Azerbaijan Province of Iran. This electoral district has a population of 314,427 and elects 1 member of parliament.

1980
MP in 1980 from the electorate of Maragheh and Ajabshir. (1st)
 Ali Urumian

1984
MP in 1984 from the electorate of Maragheh and Ajabshir. (2nd)
 Ali Urumian

1988
MP in 1988 from the electorate of Maragheh and Ajabshir. (3rd)
 Nader Taheri

1992
MP in 1992 from the electorate of Maragheh and Ajabshir. (4th)
 Mostafa Seyyed-Hashemi

1996
MP in 1996 from the electorate of Maragheh and Ajabshir. (5th)
 Mostafa Seyyed-Hashemi

2000
MP in 2000 from the electorate of Maragheh and Ajabshir. (6th)
 Mostafa Seyyed-Hashemi

2004
MP in 2004 from the electorate of Maragheh and Ajabshir. (7th)
 Mostafa Seyyed-Hashemi

2008
MP in 2008 from the electorate of Maragheh and Ajabshir. (8th)
 Yousef Najafi

2012
MP in 2012 from the electorate of Maragheh and Ajabshir. (9th)
 Mehdi Davatghari

2016

Notes

 He died twenty-two days before the start of parliament.

References

Electoral districts of East Azerbaijan
Maragheh County
Ajab Shir County
Deputies of Maragheh and Ajabshir